Desperate Youth is a 1921 American silent drama film directed by Harry B. Harris and starring Gladys Walton, J. Farrell MacDonald and Louis Willoughby.

Cast
 Gladys Walton as Rosemary Merridew
 J. Farrell MacDonald as 'Mendocino' Bill
 Louis Willoughby as 'Alabam' Spencer Merridew / Henry Merridew
 Muriel Godfrey Turner as Mrs. Merridew
 Hazel Howell as Pauline Merridew
 Harold Miller as 	Dr. Tom Dowling
 Lucretia Harris as Aunt Chlordiny
 Jim Blackwell as Sam

References

Bibliography
 Connelly, Robert B. The Silents: Silent Feature Films, 1910-36, Volume 40, Issue 2. December Press, 1998.
 Munden, Kenneth White. The American Film Institute Catalog of Motion Pictures Produced in the United States, Part 1. University of California Press, 1997.

External links
 

1921 films
1921 drama films
1920s English-language films
American silent feature films
Silent American drama films
Films directed by Harry B. Harris
American black-and-white films
Universal Pictures films
1920s American films